This is a list of casinos in Kansas.

List of casinos

See also

List of casinos in the United States
List of casino hotels

References

External links

 
Casinos
Kansas